Thomas Gerow Murphy,  (October 29, 1883 – April 7, 1971) was a Canadian politician.

Born in Northumberland County, Ontario, he was a pharmacist before being elected to the House of Commons of Canada representing the Manitoba riding of Neepawa in the 1925 federal election. A Conservative, he was defeated in the 1926 election by Progressive Robert Milne. He defeated Milne in the 1930 federal election to return to Parliament and was appointed to the Cabinet of R.B. Bennett. He was defeated in the 1935 and 1940 elections. From 1930 to 1935, he was the Superintendent-General of Indian Affairs and Minister of the Interior.

References
 

1883 births
1971 deaths
Canadian people of Irish descent
Conservative Party of Canada (1867–1942) MPs
Members of the House of Commons of Canada from Manitoba
Members of the King's Privy Council for Canada
People from Northumberland County, Ontario
Interior ministers of Canada